Sutherland is a neighborhood or subdivision of the University Heights SDA, Saskatoon, Saskatchewan.

Saskatoon Sutherland was a provincial electoral district for the Legislative Assembly of Saskatchewan, Canada. It was last contested in the 2011 provincial election before being dissolved into Saskatoon Silverspring-Sutherland and Saskatoon University.

The district was first contested in the 1975 provincial election. In its initial form, it existed until the 1991 election, when it was merged with Saskatoon University to create the new district of Saskatoon Sutherland-University. The new district was renamed back to Saskatoon Sutherland before the 1995 election.

Members of the Legislative Assembly

Election results

|-

 
|NDP
|Naveed Anwar
|align="right"|2,376
|align="right"|34.63
|align="right"|-6.01

|- bgcolor="white"
!align="left" colspan=3|Total
!align="right"|6,861
!align="right"|100.00
!align="right"|

|-

 
|NDP
|Graham Addley
|align="right"|3,410
|align="right"|40.64
|align="right"|-5.95

|- bgcolor="white"
!align="left" colspan=3|Total
!align="right"|8,391
!align="right"|100.00
!align="right"|

|-
 
| style="width: 130px" |NDP
|Graham Addley
|align="right"|3,616
|align="right"|46.59
|align="right"|+2.17

|- bgcolor="white"
!align="left" colspan=3|Total
!align="right"|7,761
!align="right"|100.00
!align="right"|

|-
 
| style="width: 130px" |NDP
|Graham Addley
|align="right"|3,234
|align="right"|44.42
|align="right"|-4.69

|- bgcolor="white"
!align="left" colspan=3|Total
!align="right"|7,280
!align="right"|100.00
!align="right"|

|-
 
| style="width: 130px" |NDP
|Mark Koenker
|align="right"|3,231
|align="right"|49.11
|align="right"|+2.14

|Prog. Conservative
|Tim McGillvray
|align="right"|499
|align="right"|7.59
|align="right"|-9.32
|- bgcolor="white"
!align="left" colspan=3|Total
!align="right"|6,579
!align="right"|100.00
!align="right"|

|-
 
| style="width: 130px" |NDP
|Mark Koenker
|align="right"|4,034
|align="right"|46.97
|align="right"|*

|Prog. Conservative
|Jim Laing
|align="right"|1,452
|align="right"|16.91
|align="right"|*
|- bgcolor="white"
!align="left" colspan=3|Total
!align="right"|8,588
!align="right"|100.00
!align="right"|

External links 
Website of the Legislative Assembly of Saskatchewan
Saskatchewan Archives Board – Provincial Election Results By Electoral Division

Former provincial electoral districts of Saskatchewan
Politics of Saskatoon